The 2018–19 Chinese Women's Volleyball Super League was the 23rd season of the Chinese Women's Volleyball Super League, the highest professional volleyball league in China. The season began on 8 November 2018 and ended with the Finals on 9 March 2019. Tianjin Bohai Bank were the defending champions.

On 9 March 2019, Beijing Baic Motor won their 1st Chinese Women's Volleyball Super League title, after defeating Tianjin Bohai Bank in the final, 3–0 (3–2, 3–1, 3–1).

Clubs

Clubs and locations

Regular season

First stage

Group A

Updated to match(es) played on 14 November 2018.
Source: Ranking Table Group A

Group B

Updated to match(es) played on 14 November 2018.
Source: Ranking Table Group B

Second stage

Top eight

Updated to match(es) played on 9 January 2019.
Source: Ranking Table Top eight

Bottom six

Updated to match(es) played on 9 January 2019.
Source: Ranking Table Bottom six

Final stage
 Best-of-five series

Bracket

Third stage

Final four
 (1) Tianjin Bohai Bank vs (4) Jiangsu Zenith Steel

|}

 (2) Beijing Baic Motor vs (3) Shanghai Bright Ubest

|}

Fourth stage

3rd place match
 Best-of-three series

|}

Final
 Best-of-five series

|}

Final standing

References

External links 
 Official website of the Chinese Volleyball Association

League 2018-19
Chinese Volleyball Super League, 2018-19
Chinese Volleyball Super League, 2018-19
Volleyball League, 2018-19
Volleyball League, 2018-19